The Mercedes-Benz M150 engine is a naturally-aspirated and supercharged, 7.7-liter, straight-8 engine, designed, developed and produced by Mercedes-Benz; between 1938 and 1944.

Applications
Mercedes-Benz 770 Großer (W150)

References

Mercedes-Benz engines
Straight-eight engines
Engines by model
Gasoline engines by model